Bob Chadwick (8 February 1927 – 5 June 1992) was an Australian rules footballer who played with Melbourne in the Victorian Football League (VFL).

Family
Robert Edward Chadwick was the son of Albert Chadwick.

Notes

References
 
 World War Two Nominal Roll, Leading Aircraftman Robert Edward Chadwick (450882), Department of Veterans' Affairs.

External links 
 

1927 births
1992 deaths
Australian rules footballers from Victoria (Australia)
Melbourne Football Club players